The British Rail Class 768 is a class of bi-mode multiple unit being converted from  passenger trains by Brush Traction and Wabtec to carry parcels.

History
In December 2018, Rail Operations Group (ROG) ordered two Class 769s that were in the process of being developed by Brush Traction from redundant Class 319s, owned by rolling stock company (ROSCO) Porterbrook. However unlike the Class 769s that remained as passenger trains, ROG's Orion High Speed Trains subsidiary intends to operate them as parcel carriers from London Liverpool Street to London Gateway.

In February 2020, a further three were ordered to allow services to be introduced the Midlands to Scotland via the West Coast Main Line. A further five has since been ordered. Originally to be classified as Class 769/5s, they were reclassified as the Class 768 before the first unit was completed.

The first units received their traction conversions at Brush Traction, Loughborough, while the latter examples will be completed by Wabtec at Doncaster Works. They then move to Eastleigh Works where Arlington Fleet Services fit out the interiors and fit roller doors to carry pallets, bulk items and parcel cages.

The units will operate in fixed formations of four (capable of running in multiples) at up to 100 mph. Unlike conventional rail freight, this provides direct access to city centres, with onward distribution from stations to be by van or bicycle courier. A demonstration from  took place on 7 July 2021.

Fleet list

References

British Rail electric multiple units
Train-related introductions in 2021
Non-passenger multiple units
25 kV AC multiple units
750 V DC multiple units